Gregory Stone Garrett (born November 22, 1995) is an American professional baseball outfielder, for the Washington Nationals of Major League Baseball (MLB). He made his MLB debut in 2022 with the Arizona Diamondbacks.

Career

Miami Marlins
Garrett was drafted by the Miami Marlins in the eighth round of the 2014 Major League Baseball draft out of George Ranch High School in Richmond, Texas. He signed with the Marlins rather than play college baseball at Rice University. He made his professional debut with the Gulf Coast Marlins. Playing with the Batavia Muckdogs in 2015, Garrett was named the Marlins Minor League Player of the Year after hitting .297 with a .933 On-base plus slugging (OPS), 11 home runs and 46 runs batted in.  He spent 2016 with the Greensboro Grasshoppers where he posted a .213 batting average with six home runs and 16 RBIs in 52 games. In 2017, he played for the Jupiter Hammerheads where he batted .212 with four home runs and 29 RBIs in 94 games.

Arizona Diamondbacks
After being cut by the Marlins in 2020, Garrett briefly decided to leave baseball and begin a full-time career in real estate. In 2021 he connected with a former Marlins scout on LinkedIn, who helped him try out and sign a minor league contract with the Arizona Diamondbacks. The Diamondbacks promoted Garrett to the major leagues on August 17, 2022. On November 15, 2022, he was designated for assignment.

Washington Nationals
On November 29, 2022, Garrett signed a major league deal with the Washington Nationals.

References

External links

Living people
1995 births
African-American baseball players
Amarillo Sod Poodles players
American expatriate baseball players in Australia
Arizona Diamondbacks players
Baseball players from Texas
Batavia Muckdogs players
Greensboro Grasshoppers players
Gulf Coast Marlins players
Jacksonville Jumbo Shrimp players
Jupiter Hammerheads players
Major League Baseball outfielders
People from Sugar Land, Texas
Reno Aces players
Sydney Blue Sox players